Mary Williamson McHenry (January 23, 1933 – March 1, 2021) was "credited with bringing African-American literature to Mount Holyoke College," where she was Emeritus Professor of English. McHenry also introduced her then student, the Pulitzer Prize-winning playwright Suzan-Lori Parks, to Five Colleges faculty member James Baldwin during the 1980s. Parks would later credit McHenry with her success.

Background
McHenry was born Mary Elizabeth Williamson Murphy in Washington, D.C., to  Alphonso Williamson (who worked with the Library of Congress) and Elizabeth Bennett Williamson (a teacher). She graduated from Oakwood School in Poughkeepsie, New York, in 1950, received her B.A. in English literature from Mount Holyoke College in 1954, her M.A. from Columbia University in 1960, and continued further graduate work at George Washington University from 1961 to 1964. McHenry also was married and divorced twice. Her first marriage was to Harry Saunders Murphy Jr. The couple married on July 31, 1954, and divorced around 1959. They had a son together. Three years later in 1962, she married Donald F. McHenry. Donald and Mary have two daughters together and later divorced on August 8, 1976. One of her daughters is named Elizabeth McHenry, a professor of English at New York University.

Career
McHenry taught at Howard University (1960–1963), George Washington University (1964–1969), and Federal City College (1969–1974). McHenry then taught at Mount Holyoke from 1974 until her retirement in 1998 "and was also a member of the American Studies and the Black (later African-American) Studies departments."

The Mary McHenry Papers (1933–1996) were exhibited from October 29 - November 26, 2007, at Mount Holyoke College.

McHenry has received recognition for her contributions to Mount Holyoke College. In 2001, McHenry's daughter, Elizabeth, honored her mother at the Elizabeth T. Kennen Lecture where she gave a presentation entitled, "Forgotten Readers: The Lost History of African American Literary Societies." The lecture highlighted "black readers and reading societies from the nineteenth- and early twentieth-centuries." Furthermore, personal documents were on display in the Mount Holyoke College in the Archives and Special Collections Lobby in Dwight Hall from October 26-November 27, 2007. Documents of her life are divided into eleven different sections and cover her life between 1933-1996. The files include personal correspondence, writings and speeches, yearbooks, and more ranging from her childhood to her time on faculty at Mount Holyoke College.

Her successful career made an impact on several lives. Mary Elizabeth Williamson Murphy impacted Mount Holyoke College by incorporating the field of African American literature into the college. Her contributions as a professor "continue to enrich many students' experience in studying literature". When she first arrived in the early 1950s as a student, there were only five African American women in the entire college. She graduated in 1954. Twenty years after graduation, she returned to Mount Holyoke College in 1974 to take up a position as an English professor. When she returned to join the faculty, there were 140 African American students attending Mount Holyoke College. Her daughter Elizabeth McHenry followed in her steps, teaching African American literature. Mary Elizabeth Williamson Murphy significantly impacted multiple students' lives. One in particular is Michelle L. Taylor, who graduated in 1994 and became a professor of English at the Miami University of Ohio. Associate professor of the African American studies department at Mount Holyoke College quotes Taylor by stating, "Michelle credits Mary with her interest in teaching and her interest in African American literature.". Lastly, Pulitzer Prize Winner for drama Suzan Lori Parks also refers to her as her favorite English during her time at Mount Holyoke College.  McHenry asked Parks if she would be interested in submitting her first papers to James Baldwin.

She died on March 1, 2021, at her home in Washington, DC.

References

External links
 Biography
 Mary McHenry Papers
  Lecture to Explore Lost History of African American Literary Societies (2001)
 MHC lectures traces literary circle history(2001)

1933 births
2021 deaths
African-American academics
Mount Holyoke College alumni
Mount Holyoke College faculty
Howard University faculty
University of the District of Columbia faculty
Columbia University alumni
George Washington University faculty
People from Washington, D.C.
21st-century African-American people